The Weapon is a 1956 black and white British thriller film directed by Val Guest and starring Steve Cochran, Lizabeth Scott, Herbert Marshall, and Nicole Maurey. It was made by Republic Pictures. Its themes were originally explored in the 1951 British film The Yellow Balloon.

The film was shot in the east end of London and at Walton Studios, with sets designed by art director John Stoll.

Plot
Elsa Jenner (Lizabeth Scott) is an American-born war widow who lives in London with her young son Erik. While playing with friends in Aldersgate, Erik hides in the basement of a bomb-damaged building, Erik finds a handgun stuck in a lump of concrete. As all the boys try to pull it free, it accidentally fires a shot from Erik's hands, hitting another boy. Believing he has killed his friend, Erik runs away.

A policeman relates the events to his mother and explains the boy who was shot is alive but in hospital.

Efforts to locate Erik are aided by US Army Captain Mark Andrews (Steve Cochran), after it is discovered that the gun which Erik found has a past, and was used in a murder of an American serviceman during the war. This background causes a dangerous criminal to pursue the young boy. Erik goes to the cafe where his mum usually works but she is not there. He runs off again just before she arrives with Cpt Andrews. As he inches closer to finding Erik, Andrews comes across Vivienne Pascal (Nicole Maurey), a dance-hall hostess with a connection to the gun's original owner. But she has all but lost her faith in all things good, declaring to Andrews: "I am dead." As Captain Andrews interviews her she is shot through the window by Henry. Andrews pursues him but is overpowered in an empty factory. Disturbed by a policeman Henry jumps out of a window into the Thames.

As Andrews continues his investigation into the gun's whereabouts, Erik's mother Elsa finally locates her son with the helpful assistance of relative stranger Joshua Henry. He falsely alleges that Erik had stolen a bottle of milk from him. Henry starts wooing Elsa, and is at her house when Erik calls. They go to pick him up in Henry's car. Henry persuades them to take him to the gun which is hidden in a ruin. They debate the milk theft and it becomes clear that Henry has ill intentions, prompting Elsa to push Erik out of the car and run away. The car crashes on a bomb site and Elsa is pulled from the wreckage. Henry runs after the boy, onto a bomb site and catches him.

At the crash site, members of the public come to Elsa's aid. Among them is Captain Andrews, with whom Elsa pleads not to worry about her, and to save her son instead. Andrews immediately enters the old building into which Henry was seen running, and Andrews and Henry fight their way higher and higher in the building. Henry falls from the rooftop and is killed.

Cast
Steve Cochran as Mark Andrews
Lizabeth Scott as Elsa Jenner
George Cole as Joshua Henry
Herbert Marshall as Superintendent Mackenzie
Nicole Maurey as Vivienne
Jon Whiteley as Erik
Laurence Naismith as Jamison
Stanley Maxted as The Colonel
Denis Shaw as Groggins
John Horsley as Johnson
Fred Johnson as Fitzsimmons
Frazer Hines as Jimmy (uncredited)
Peter Godsell as David (uncredited)
Terry Cooke as Johnny (uncredited)

Critical reception
Britmovie called the film "a well-crafted, energetic suspense thriller", while Leonard Maltin called it a "minor but trim story of youngster who accidentally shoots his pal and runs away."

External links 

 Turner Classic Movies overview
 New York Times review

See also
List of American films of 1956

References

Films directed by Val Guest
1956 films
1950s English-language films
1950s thriller films
British thriller films
Films set in London
1950s British films
British black-and-white films